Sky Georgia (Georgian: საერთაშორისო ავიაკომპანია „სქაი ჯორჯია“ - saertašoriso aviaqompania «sqai dzhordzhia») was an airline from Tbilisi, Georgia, operating out of Tbilisi International Airport.

History 
The airline was established in 1998 as Air Bisec. In 2004, it was renamed Georgian National Airlines. The current Sky Georgia brand was adopted in 2008, when the company was acquired by US-based Sky Investment Group. In October 2009, the airline ceased all scheduled flights and stated that it would concentrate on cargo rather than on passenger transport. In January 2010, three Ilyushin Il-76 freighter aircraft were leased.

Georgy Kodua was general director and CEO of Sky Georgia.

During 2007, the airline (which was called Georgian National Airlines at that time) had a codeshare agreement with airBaltic on the latter's route from Riga to Tbilisi. In summer 2008, scheduled and charter services were operated from Tbilisi, Kutaisi and Batumi to destinations in Europe and Central Asia. On 9 August 2008, following the outbreak of the 2008 South Ossetia war, Georgian National Airlines was banned from operating into Russia. After the crisis, flights were not resumed.

Destinations 

As of January 2011, the official Sky Georgia timetable does not list any scheduled flights.

Former destinations
Sky Georgia used to serve the following scheduled destinations:

Asia
Georgia
Batumi - Batumi International Airport
Tbilisi - Tbilisi International Airport

Europe
Belarus
Minsk - Minsk International Airport
Turkey
Antalya - Antalya Airport
Ukraine
Kyiv - Boryspil International Airport

Fleet

Historic fleet
Over the years, the airline operated the following aircraft types:
Tupolev Tu-134B (until 2007)
Bombardier CRJ200 (2007–2008)
Ilyushin Il-76T (from 2010)
McDonnell Douglas DC-9-50

Notes

References

External links

Official website

Defunct airlines of Georgia (country)
Companies based in Tbilisi
Airlines established in 2003
Airlines disestablished in 2011
2003 establishments in Georgia (country)
2011 disestablishments in Georgia (country)